Patrick is a 2019 Belgian comedy-drama film directed by Tim Mielants and starring Kevin Janssens, Jemaine Clement, Hannah Hoekstra, and Bouli Lanners. It had its world premiere at the 54th Karlovy Vary International Film Festival, where it competed for the Crystal Globe, winning the Best Director Award for Mielants. It received five nominations at the 10th Magritte Awards, winning Best Flemish Film.

Cast
 Kevin Janssens as Patrick
 Jemaine Clement as Dustin
 Hannah Hoekstra as Nathalie
 Jan Bijvoet as Flik
 Bouli Lanners as Mon
 Josse De Pauw as Rudy
 Pierre Bokma as Herman
 Frank Vercruyssen as Wilfried
 Jean-Benoît Ugeux as the retailer

Accolades

References

External links
 

2019 films
2019 comedy-drama films
Belgian comedy-drama films
2010s Dutch-language films
2010s French-language films
Magritte Award winners
2019 multilingual films
Belgian multilingual films
French-language Belgian films